Resistance (released as Rebellion Season 2 on Netflix) is a 2019 television miniseries written by Colin Teevan for Irish broadcaster RTÉ, dramatising the events surrounding the Irish War of Independence.

Set during the time of Bloody Sunday in 1920, it is a sequel to the 2016 miniseries, Rebellion, which was set during the 1916 Easter Rising.

Production

Filming began in October 2016.

Cast

Characters returning from Rebellion
 Brian Gleeson - Jimmy Mahon, a 1916 veteran now serving with the IRA.
 Jordanne Jones - Minnie Mahon
 Jaeylynne Wallace Ruane - Sadie Mahon
 Millie Donnelly - Gracie Mahon
 Michael Ford-FitzGerald - Harry Butler, wealthy banker from whom the rebel government seek funds.
 Gavin Drea - Michael Collins, IRA Director of Intelligence, a charismatic and headstrong leader. (Collins was played by Sebastian Thommen in Rebellion)
 Simone Kirby - Ursula Sweeney, Dublin Castle codebreaker

New characters
David Wilmot - Patrick (Paddy) Mahon, Jimmy's brother, a member of the Royal Irish Constabulary (RIC).
Stanley Townsend - Daniel Shea, an Irish-American US Senator, sympathetic to the independence movement.
Conall Keating - Joey Bradley, IRA gunman.
Aoife Duffin - Éithne Drury, republican journalist
Natasha O'Keeffe - Agnes Moore, Ursula's sister, a lawyer working in the Dáil Courts
Catherine Walker - Constance Butler, republican sympathiser; wife of Harry
Fergal McElherron - Maurice Jacobs, solicitor and agent for the rebel government.
Ben Smith - Robbie Lennox, English journalist and socialist. Based on the historical F. Digby Hardy.
Andrew Bennet - Arthur Griffith, Minister for Home Affairs and vice-president of Sinn Féin
Craig Parkinson - Captain David McLeod, British soldier.
Conor MacNeill - Diarmuid McWilliams, republican journalist.
Aoibhínn McGinnity - Josephine Carmichael, cabaret singer and Harry Butler's mistress.
Matthew Hopkinson - Albert Finlay, a hot-headed Black and Tan
Paul Ritter - General Ormonde Winter, Chief of Intelligence in Dublin Castle
Tom Bennett - Mark Sturgis, Winter's opposite number in the British civil service.
Hugh O'Conor - Dr. Lawrence Moore, doctor with republican sympathies. Husband to Agnes.
Imogen Doel - Lily Lawlor, typist in Dublin Castle
Barbara Bergin - Mrs. Lyons, landlady
Brian Doherty - Frank Brogan, IRA leader

Episode list

Reception

The first episode was criticised for departure from historical fact; Teevan had already resigned himself to such, he admitted in an interview with The Irish Times.

The Irish Catholic criticised what they called the "nasty nuns" subplot; in the historical event that the adoption storyline was based on, Josephine Marchment Brown, a widow working in Victoria Barracks in Cork, lost custody of her son to her in-laws who took the boy to Wales. The IRA kidnapped the boy back for her in return for her passing information to them. Foreign adoptions from mother-and-baby homes, of the kind depicted in Resistance, did not begin until the 1940s.

Chris Wasser of the Irish Independent awarded the first episode three stars, saying "What we have here is a reasonably capable and competent drama that, though rough around the edges, suggests we may be in for a stronger and tighter run than last time. […] It isn’t nearly as vital or as thrilling as it needs to be, and Catherine Morshead’s flat direction doesn’t help. But there is something here."

Website IrishCentral was more positive, saying "The first episode of Resistance is deliciously plotted with loyalty, betrayal, irony, but most of all, the bravery of ordinary Dubliners taking on the greatest intelligence service in the world and, as history tells us, eventually winning. Resistance is not to be missed."

References

External links
 

2019 Irish television series debuts
2019 Irish television series endings
RTÉ original programming
Irish television miniseries
Television shows set in Dublin (city)
Television shows set in Ireland
Television series based on actual events
Television series set in the 1920s
Cultural depictions of Michael Collins (Irish leader)
Works about the Irish War of Independence
Television series by Banijay
Films directed by Catherine Morshead